Raymond Murphy may refer to:

 Raymond G. Murphy (1930–2007), Medal of Honor  recipient
 Raymond M. Murphy (born 1927), American politician from Michigan
 Raymond E. Murphy, American official in the United States Department of State

 Raymond Murphy, American author of English Grammar in Use